The Ramoshi (alternately Berad or Bedar) are an Indian aboriginal community found largely in Maharashtra, Madhya Pradesh, and Karnataka. They are classified  as a Scheduled Tribe by the government of India.

History
The Ramoshi in Maharashtra were earlier known as Boya, Bedar and Vedan.

Bedars were dacoit and thieves but later they were employed  by the Maratha rulers. They were then classified as a criminal tribe under the Criminal Tribes Acts of the Raj.

Culture
They are considered  Kshatriya in Hindu religion. They belong to the Hindu section while some are Vaishanavas.

References

Further reading
 Precolonial India in Practice, Cynthia Talbot, Oxford University Press, 2001,

External links
 Caste & Class Articulation of Andhra Pradesh

Denotified tribes of India
Indian castes
Social groups of Karnataka
Social groups of Maharashtra
Scheduled Tribes of Karnataka